Admiral Sir William James Hope-Johnstone KCB (28 July 1798 – 11 July 1878) was a Royal Navy officer who became Commander-in-Chief, The Nore.

Naval career
Born the second son of Vice-Admiral Sir William Johnstone Hope, William James Hope-Johnstone joined the Royal Navy in 1811. Promoted to Captain in 1823, he commanded HMS Doris, HMS Asia, HMS Britannia, HMS Agincourt and then HMS Albion. He was appointed Superintendent of Haslar Hospital and the Royal Clarence Victualling Yard in 1852, Commander-in-Chief, South East Coast of America Station in 1854 and Commander-in-Chief, The Nore in 1860.

There is a memorial to Hope-Johnstone at the Johnstone Church Burial Ground in Dumfries.

Family
In 1826 Hope-Johnstone married Eleanor Kirkpatrick; they had three daughters.

References

Sources

|-

|-

1798 births
1878 deaths
Royal Navy admirals
Knights Commander of the Order of the Bath